Frank Catania (born November 17, 1941) is an American politician who served in the New Jersey General Assembly from the 35th Legislative District from 1990 to 1994.

References

1941 births
Living people
Republican Party members of the New Jersey General Assembly
Politicians from Paterson, New Jersey